Diane Reay is a sociologist and academic, who is Professor of Education at the University of Cambridge. She is noted for her study about educational inequalities among students in state schools in the United Kingdom. She has maintained that there is a tendency to misuse the school selection practice to transform social class differences into education. For instance, she criticized the Oxbridge application process as "institutionally racist".

Working-class student experiences 

Reay's research highlights the challenges that working-class students have in higher education, in particular when accessing and transitioning to and within higher education.

Background 
Reay is the daughter of a coal miner and the eldest of eight children. She was raised on a council estate and was given free school meals while a young student. In an interview, she said, "I learned as a small child I had to work at least twice as hard as the middle class children to achieve the same result."

She taught in a London primary school for 20 years before she began work at Cambridge, where she is currently an emeritus professor of sociology of education.

References

Selected publications
 Reay, Diane. Miseducation: Inequality, Education and the Working Classes. 1st ed., Bristol University Press, 2017, https://doi.org/10.2307/j.ctt22p7k7m.

Year of birth missing (living people)
Living people
Academics of the University of Cambridge
British educational theorists
British sociologists